Chester County (Pennsylvania Dutch: Tscheschter Kaundi), colloquially known as Chesco, is a county in the Commonwealth of Pennsylvania. It is located in the Delaware Valley region, located in the southeastern part of the state. As of the 2020 census, the population was 534,413, increasing by 7.1% from 498,886 in 2010. The county seat and most populated municipality is West Chester. Chester County was one of the three original Pennsylvania counties created by William Penn in 1682. It was named for Chester, England.

Chester County is part of the Philadelphia-Camden-Wilmington, PA-NJ-DE-MD Metropolitan Statistical Area. Eastern Chester County is home to many communities that comprise part of the Philadelphia Main Line western suburbs outside of Philadelphia, while part of its southernmost portion is considered suburban Wilmington, along with southwest Delaware County.

History

Philadelphia, Bucks, and Chester were the three Pennsylvania counties initially created by William Penn on August 24, 1682. At that time, Chester County's borders were Philadelphia County to the north, the ill-defined western edge of the colony (approximately the Susquehanna River) to the west, the Delaware River to the east, and Delaware and Maryland to the south. Chester County replaced the Pennsylvania portion of New Netherland/New York’s "Upland", which was officially eliminated when Pennsylvania was chartered on March 4, 1681, but did not cease to exist until June of that year. Much of the Welsh Tract was in eastern Chester County, and Welsh place names, given by early settlers, continue to predominate there.

The fourth county in the state, Lancaster County, was formed from Chester County on May 10, 1729.  On March 11, 1752, Berks County was formed from the northern section of Chester County, as well as parts of Lancaster and Philadelphia counties.

The original Chester County seat was the City of Chester, a center of naval shipbuilding, at the eastern edge of the county. In an effort to accommodate the increased population of the western part of the county, the county seat was moved to a more central location in 1788; in order to mollify the eastern portion of the county, the village, known as Turk's Head, was renamed West Chester. In response to the new location of the county seat, the eastern portion of the county separated and formed the new Delaware County in 1789 with the City of Chester as its county seat.

Much of the history of Chester County arises from its location between Philadelphia and the Susquehanna River.  The first road to "the West" (meaning Lancaster County) passed through the central part of Chester County, following the Great Valley westward; with some re-alignments, it became the Lincoln Highway and later U.S. Route 30. This road is still named Lancaster Avenue in most of the Chester County towns it runs through.  The first railroad (which became the Pennsylvania Railroad) followed much the same route, and the Reading Railroad progressed up the Schuylkill River to Reading. Industry tended to concentrate along the rail lines. Easy transportation allowed workers to commute to urban jobs, and the rise of the suburbs followed. To this day, the developed areas form "fingers" extending along major lines of transportation.

During the American Revolutionary War, the Battle of Brandywine was fought at what is now the southeastern fringe of the county.  The Valley Forge encampment was at the northeastern edge.

Geography
The topography consists of rolling hills and valleys and it is part of the region known as the Piedmont.

Watersheds that serve Chester County include the Octoraro, the Brandywine, and Chester creeks, and the Schuylkill River. Many of the soils are fertile, rich loam as much as twenty-four inches thick; together with the temperate climate, this was long a major agricultural area. Because of its proximity to Philadelphia, Chester County has seen large waves of development over the past half-century due to suburbanization. Although development in Chester County has increased, agriculture is still a major part of the county's economy, and the number of horse farms is increasing in the county. Mushroom growing is a specialty in the southern portion of the county.

Elevations (in feet):
High point—1020 Welsh Mt., Honeybrook Twp. Other high points—960 Thomas Hill, Warwick Twp; 960 Barren Hill, West Caln Twp. Low point—66 Schuylkill River, Chester-Montgomery county line. Cities and boroughs: Coatesville 314; Downingtown 255; Kennett Square 300; Oxford 535; Parkesburg 542; Phoenixville 127; Spring City 114; West Chester 459.

Adjacent counties
Berks County (north)
Montgomery County (northeast)
Delaware County (east)
New Castle County, Delaware (southeast)
Cecil County, Maryland (south)
Lancaster County (west)

National protected area
Valley Forge National Historical Park (part)

State protected areas
French Creek State Park
Marsh Creek State Park
White Clay Creek Preserve

Major roads and highways

Economy and environment 
Lanchester Landfill, located on the border of Chester and Lancaster Counties, captures methane which is sold for renewable natural gas credits, and piped to seven local businesses. This reduces the county's methane emissions, and provides an alternative to fracking for shale gas. In addition, several companies have their headquarters or a major presence in the county including Bentley Systems, EBS Healthcare, Main Line Health, Lavazza North America (formerly Mars Drinks), Depuy Synthes (part of Johnson & Johnson), Metabo, QVC, Hankin Group, Axalta Coating Systems, CTDI, Pactiv, Ricoh Americas, Blinding Edge Pictures, AmerisourceBergen, J.G. Wentworth, The Vanguard Group, and Victory Brewing Company among others.

Demographics

As of the 2010 census, the county was 82.1% White Non-Hispanic, 6.1% Black or African American, 0.2% Native American or Alaskan Native, 3.9% Asian, 0.0% Native Hawaiian, 1.8% were two or more races, and 2.4% were some other race. 6.5% of the population were Hispanic or Latino.

As of the census of 2000, there were 433,501 people, 157,905 households, and 113,375 families residing in the county. There were 163,773 housing units at an average density of 217 per square mile (84/km2). The racial makeup of the county was 89.21% White, 6.24% Black or African American, 0.15% Native American, 1.95% Asian, 0.03% Pacific Islander, 1.35% from other races, and 1.06% from two or more races. 3.72% of the population were Hispanic or Latino of any race. 18.0% were of Irish, 17.3% German, 13.1% Italian, 10.1% English and 5.6% American ancestry. 91.4% spoke English and 3.7% Spanish as their first language.

There were 157,905 households, out of which 35.10% had children under the age of 18 living with them, 60.50% were married couples living together, 8.10% had a female householder with no husband present, and 28.20% were non-families. 22.60% of all households were made up of individuals, and 7.60% had someone living alone who was 65 years of age or older. The average household size was 2.65 and the average family size was 3.15.

In the county, the population was spread out, with 26.20% under the age of 18, 7.90% from 18 to 24, 30.40% from 25 to 44, 23.80% from 45 to 64, and 11.70% who were 65 years of age or older. The median age was 37 years. For every 100 females there were 96.40 males. For every 100 females age 18 and over, there were 93.10 males.

The median income for a household in the county was $65,295, and the median income for a family was $76,916 (these figures had risen to $80,818 and $97,894 respectively as of a 2007 estimate). Males had a median income of $51,223 versus $34,854 for females. The per capita income for the county was $31,627. About 3.10% of families and 5.20% of the population were below the poverty line, including 5.10% of those under age 18 and 5.50% of those age 65 or over.

The region was originally occupied by the Lenni Lenape people, who greeted European settlers in the seventeenth century with amity and kindness. British settlers were mostly English, Scotch-Irish and Welsh in ethnicity. From the late 19th to early 20th century, the industrial areas of the region, such as Coatesville, attracted immigrants and job seekers from Germany and Ireland, Eastern Europe, Italy, and the American rural South, with both black and white migrants coming north. Later Hispanic immigrants have included Puerto Ricans and, most recently, Mexicans.

Long a primarily rural area, Chester County is now  the fastest-growing county in the Delaware Valley; it is one of the fastest growing in the entire Northeastern section of the United States.

Religion

In keeping with its colonial history, Chester County is home to a number of historic Quaker buildings, including Birmingham, Birmingham Orthodox, Bradford, Caln, Old Kennett, Parkersville, Westtown, and Uwchlan meeting houses. Other historic religious buildings include St. Malachi Church, southeastern Pennsylvania's oldest active Catholic mission church, and the Episcopal St. Mary's, St. Paul's, and St. Peter's churches, and Washington Memorial Chapel. Also located in the county are the First Presbyterian Church of West Chester, Coventryville United Methodist Church, which is part of the Coventryville Historic District, and Beth Israel Congregation of Chester County, a Conservative synagogue in Coatesville, a site of Eastern European immigration in the 20th century.

2020 Census

Politics

Voter registration
According to the Secretary of State's office, Democrats comprise a plurality of registered voters in Chester County.

Election results 

Chester County has historically been reliably Republican at the county level; traditionally, it was the most conservative county in the Philadelphia area. In recent elections, however, it has been trending Democratic, though not as overwhelmingly as the rest of the Philadelphia suburbs. In 2000, Al Gore lost it by almost 10 percent, but in 2004 George W. Bush defeated John Kerry by a much smaller margin of only 4.5 percent. In 2008, Chester County sided with the rest of Pennsylvania and voted for Barack Obama by a much larger margin of 9%, making him the first Democrat to carry it in a Presidential election since 1964. But, in 2009, with a smaller turnout, Republican candidates swept all county-row offices, winning with an average margin of 20%. In 2012, the county voted for Republican candidate Mitt Romney, by a very small margin of about 500 votes.

In 2016, despite Pennsylvania voting for a Republican presidential candidate for the first time since 1988, Chester County voted more Democratic than in 2012, with Hillary Clinton leading Donald Trump by over 25,000 votes or 9.4 percentage points; a 9.2 percentage point swing from 2012. The only two statewide winners in 2016 to carry Chester County were U.S. Senator Pat Toomey (R) and Pennsylvania State Treasurer Joe Torsella (D). Republican candidates John Brown and John Rafferty carried Chester County, though both lost their races for Auditor General and Attorney General, respectively (Rafferty, a State Senator whose district includes northern Chester County, carried the county by a slim margin of 50 votes) Emphasizing its Democratic shift even further, Joe Biden defeated Donald Trump by a whopping 17.1 points in Chester County in the 2020 election; Trump's percentage of votes was the lowest for any Republican since 1912. Such a major shift was a major factor in Biden's success of flipping Pennsylvania back to the Democratic column.

Democrats have made gains in Chester County state legislative seats in recent elections. Democrat Andy Dinniman picked up the 19th Senate District in May 2006 in the special election to replace the late Robert Thompson. Democrat Barbara McIlvaine Smith picked up the open 156th House district in November 2006, winning by 28 votes and tipping the State-House majority to the Democrats. This was the first time that a Democrat had served part of Chester County as State Representative since Jim Gerlach (who represented much of Chester County for 12 years in Congress) unseated Sam Morris in 1990. In 2008, two more open House seats in the county went Democratic—to Tom Houghton in the 13th and Paul Drucker in the 157th. In 2010, however, Chester County swung back to the GOP, with Republicans Dan Truitt (who defeated McIlvaine Smith), Warren Kampf (who defeated Drucker), and John Lawrence (who defeated Houghton) all elected to the State House.

On November 8, 2017, Democrats made historic inroads in Chester County by winning their first county row office seats in history, picking up 4 row office seats. On November 5, 2019, Democrats swept countywide row office seat elections and took a majority on the Board of Commissioners, for a first time in county history.

|}

Government

Commissioners
Chester County is administered by a three-person Board of Commissioners, who serve four-year terms. Elections occur in the odd-numbered years that precede U.S. Presidential elections, with the next election falling in 2023.  The Commissioners have selective policy-making authority to provide certain local services and facilities on a county-wide basis.  Accordingly, the commissioners are responsible for the management of the fiscal and administrative functions of the county.

:

County row officers
As of January 3, 2023:

United States House of Representatives

As of January 3, 2023:

United States Senate
As of January 3, 2023:

State House of Representatives

As of January 3, 2023:

State Senate

As of January 3, 2023:

Education

Colleges and universities

Cheyney University of Pennsylvania (partially in Delaware County)
Delaware County Community College (locations in Exton, Downingtown, Phoenixville and West Grove)
Immaculata University
Lincoln University
Penn State Great Valley
University of Valley Forge
West Chester University of Pennsylvania

Public school districts

School districts include:
Avon Grove School District
Coatesville Area School District
Downingtown Area School District
Great Valley School District
Kennett Consolidated School District
Octorara Area School District
Owen J. Roberts School District
Oxford Area School District
Phoenixville Area School District
Spring-Ford Area School District
Tredyffrin-Easttown School District
Twin Valley School District
Unionville-Chadds Ford School District
West Chester Area School District

Charter schools

 Achievement House Charter School grades 9-12, Exton
 Avon Grove Charter School grades K-12, West Grove
 Chester County Family Academy Charter School grades K-2, West Chester
 Collegium Charter School grades K-12, Exton
 Pennsylvania Leadership Charter School K-12, West Chester
 Renaissance Academy Charter School grades K-12, Phoenixville
 Sankofa Academy Charter School grades 5–8, West Chester
 21st Century Cyber Charter School grades 6-12. Downingtown.

Independent schools
Bishop Shanahan High School (Archdiocese of Philadelphia)
Center for Arts and Technology (Administered by Chester County Intermediate Unit)
Church Farm School (now called CFS the School at Church Farm)
Delaware Valley Friends School
Devon Preparatory School
Fairville Friends School (Chadds Ford, Pennsylvania)
Goshen Friends School (West Chester, Pennsylvania)
Kimberton Waldorf School (Kimberton, Pennsylvania)
London Grove Friends Kindergarten (Kennett Square, Pennsylvania)
Malvern Preparatory School
The Concept School - 6th through 12th Grade
Upattinas School and Resource Center (Glenmoore, Pennsylvania)
Upland Country Day School (UCDS) - Pre-K through 9th Grade
Villa Maria Academy (Malvern, Pennsylvania)
Villa Maria Academy Lower School (Immaculata, Pennsylvania)
West-Mont Christian Academy
West Chester Friends School
West Fallowfield Christian School
Westtown School
Windsor Christian Academy - K through 6th Grade
Windsor Christian Preschool
Regina Luminis Academy

Libraries
The Chester County Library System in southeastern Pennsylvania was organized in 1965. It is a federated system composed of a District Center Library in Exton and sixteen member libraries. The system provides materials and information for life, work and pleasure.

Communities

Under Pennsylvania law, there are four types of incorporated municipalities: cities, boroughs, townships, and, in at most two cases, towns. The post office uses community names and boundaries that usually do not correspond to the townships, and usually only have the same names as the municipalities for the cities and boroughs.  The names used by the post office are generally used by residents to describe where they live. The following cities, boroughs and townships are located in Chester County:

City
Coatesville

Boroughs

Atglen
Avondale
Downingtown
Elverson
Honey Brook
Kennett Square
Malvern
Modena
Oxford
Parkesburg
Phoenixville
South Coatesville
Spring City
West Chester (county seat)
West Grove

Townships

Birmingham
Caln
Charlestown
East Bradford
East Brandywine
East Caln
East Coventry
East Fallowfield
East Goshen
East Marlborough
East Nantmeal
East Nottingham
East Pikeland
East Vincent
East Whiteland
Easttown
Elk
Franklin
Highland
Honey Brook
Kennett
London Britain
London Grove
Londonderry
Lower Oxford
New Garden
New London
Newlin
North Coventry
Penn
Pennsbury
Pocopson
Sadsbury
Schuylkill
South Coventry
Thornbury
Tredyffrin
Upper Oxford
Upper Uwchlan
Uwchlan
Valley
Wallace
Warwick
West Bradford
West Brandywine
West Caln
West Fallowfield
West Goshen
West Marlborough
West Nantmeal
West Nottingham
West Pikeland
West Sadsbury
West Vincent
West Whiteland
Westtown
Willistown

Census-designated places
Census-designated places are unincorporated communities designated by the U.S. Census Bureau for the purposes of compiling demographic data. They are not actual jurisdictions under Pennsylvania law.

Berwyn
Caln
Chadds Ford (partly in Delaware County)
Chesterbrook
Cheyney University (partly in Delaware County)
Cochranville
Devon
Dilworthtown (partly in Delaware County)
Eagle
Eagleview
Exton
Frazer
Glenmoore
Hamorton
Hayti
Kenilworth
Kimberton
Lincoln University
Lionville
Marshallton
Nottingham
Paoli
Pomeroy
Pughtown
Sadsburyville
South Pottstown
Thorndale
Toughkenamon
Unionville
Westwood

Other unincorporated communities

Birchrunville
Black Horse
Brandamore
Bucktown
Byers Station
Cedarville
Chatham
Chester Springs
Chesterville
Compass
Coventryville
Cromby
Darlington Corners
Daylesford
Devault
Doe Run
Dorlan
Embreeville
Ercildoun
Faggs Manor
Glenloch
Goshenville
Hallman
Harmony Hill
Harmonyville
Hayesville
Hephzibah
Hickory Hill
Hiestand
Homeville
Hopewell
Humphreyville
Icedale
Ironsides
Isabella
Jennersville
Kaolin
Kelton
Kemblesville
Knauertown 
Landenberg
Lenape
Lewisville
London Grove
Longwood
Lower Hopewell
Ludwigs Corner
Lyndell
Mendenhall
Milford Mills
Mortonville
Morstein
Nantmeal Village
Northbrook
Parker Ford
Pocopson
Russellville
Saint Peters
Siousca
Springdell
Steelville
Strafford
Strickersville
Sugartown
Suplee
Valley Forge
Wagontown
Warwick
West Goshen
Whitford
Willowdale
Yellow Springs

Historic community
Barnestown

Population ranking
The population ranking of the following table is based on the 2020 census of Chester County.

† county seat

Climate
Chester County has four distinct seasons and has a hot-summer humid continental climate (Dfa) except for some far southern lowlands and areas along the Schuylkill River which have a humid subtropical climate (Cfa). The hardiness zones are 6b and 7a.

Public health

Opioid crisis 

In both 2018 and 2019, deaths from drug overdoses in Chester County declined. Of the 104 drug overdoses recorded by the coroner, an estimated 77 percent involved the presence of fentanyl. One of the reasons for the decline in overdose deaths was "the saturation across the county of Narcan, the anti-opioid nasal spray that can revive someone suffering an overdose." In 2019, any resident of Chester County could obtain a free Narcan dose at community training events across the county.

Notable people
 Jesse B. Aikin (1808–1900), first to produce a song book with a seven-shape note system
 Samuel Barber (1910–1981), one of the most celebrated composers of the 20th century
 Eusebius Barnard (1802–1865), Quaker minister and station master on the Underground Railroad
 Mifflin E. Bell (1847–1904), architect who served from 1883 to 1886 as Supervising Architect of the US Treasury Department
 Daniel Garrison Brinton (1837–1899), physician and ethnologist who taught at the University of Pennsylvania
 Scott Brunner (born 1957), NFL quarterback during the 1980s
 Margaret F. Butler (1861–1931), professor of otorhinolaryngology at the Woman's Medical College of Pennsylvania
 Samuel Butler (1825–1891), Pennsylvania State Representative and Pennsylvania Treasurer from 1880 to 1882
 Smedley Butler (1881–1940), twice recipient of the Medal of Honor, thwarted the Business Plot, advocate for veterans, author
 Jefferson David Chalfant (1856–1931), painter best known for his trompe-l'œil still lifes
 John Cochran (1730–1807), physician and 4th Surgeon General of the United States Army
 James D. Corrothers (1869–1917), African American poet, journalist, minister, and friend of Paul Laurence Dunbar
 Isabel Darlington (1865–1950), lawyer and the first woman to gain admittance to the bar and practice law in Chester County
 Bruce Davidson (born 1949), multiple Olympian in equestrian eventing; noted competition-horse breeder and trainer
 Sarah Dolley (1829–1909), physician and the first woman to complete a medical internship in the United States
 Ryan Dunn (1977–2011), actor, television personality, and daredevil; died in a car crash in West Goshen
 William Hood Dunwoody (1841–1914), businessman and partner in the firm that became General Mills
 Phillip Dutton (born 1963), Australian-born Olympic-level equestrian rider in eventing
 John Filson (1747–1788), author, historian, pioneer, surveyor, and founder of Cincinnati
 James Fitzpatrick (1748–1778), highwayman and loyalist during the American Revolutionary War
 Bartholomew Fussell (1794–1871), abolitionist active in the Underground Railroad; early advocate for women's careers in medicine
 Kyle Gallner (born 1986), actor
 Robert Grace (1709–1766), first manufacturer of the Franklin stove
 Joseph Graham (1759–1836), Revolutionary War militia officer, North Carolina politician, and ironmonger
 Isaac Israel Hayes (1832–1881), Arctic explorer and physician
 Francis James (1799–1886), lawyer, state senator, and member of the US House of Representatives
 Charlton Thomas Lewis (1834–1904), lawyer and lexicographer who compiled several Latin-English dictionaries
 George Lippard (1822–1854), novelist (The Quaker City; or, The Monks of Monk Hall), journalist, and social reformer
 Rebecca Webb Lukens (1794–1854), first female owner and manager of the company that became the Lukens Steel Mill
 William Maclay (1737–1804), Pennsylvania state legislator and US Senator who served in the 1st United States Congress 
 Franklin MacVeagh (1837–1934), banker and U.S. Secretary of the Treasury
 Bam Margera (born 1979), professional skateboarder, television and radio personality, and daredevil
 Boyd Martin (born 1979), Australian-born equestrian competing in eventing; has participated in two Summer Olympics
 Jon Matlack (born 1950), baseball pitcher for the New York Mets and Texas Rangers (1971–83), All Star and N.L. champion
 Henry McBride (1867–1962), art critic who wrote for Art News, The Dial, and The New York Sun
 Joseph McClellan (1746–1834), Continental Army captain, brevet colonel of militia, and Pennsylvania State Senator 
 Charles Follen McKim (1847–1909), one of the most prominent American Beaux-Arts architects of the late nineteenth century
 Joseph McMinn (1758–1824), politician who served as Speaker of the Tennessee Senate and 4th Governor of Tennessee
 Thomas Harrison Montgomery Jr. (1873–1912), zoologist and expert in cell biology, invertebrates, and birds
 George Foot Moore (1851–1931), historian of religion, minister, and professor at Andover Theological Seminary and Harvard University
 Hezekiah Niles (1777–1839), editor and publisher of the Weekly Register, one of the highest circulating papers in the United States
 John Grubb Parke, Union general during the American Civil War and victor of the Battle of Fort Stedman (1865)
 Herb Pennock (1894–1948), Hall of Fame baseball pitcher; also known as the "Squire of Kennett Square"
 Elijah F. Pennypacker (1804–1888), abolitionist and Underground Railroad station master
 George Morris Philips (1851–1920), principal of West Chester University from 1881 to 1920
 Evan Pugh (1828–1864), agricultural chemist and first president of Pennsylvania State University
 Thomas Buchanan Read (1822–1872), poet and portrait painter
 George W. Roberts (1833–1862), Union Army colonel killed in action at the Battle of Stones River
 Barclay Rubincam (1920–1978), regionalist painter affiliated with the Brandywine School
 Bayard Rustin (1912–1987), civil rights leader posthumously awarded the Presidential Medal of Freedom
 Matt Ryan (born 1985), quarterback for the Atlanta Falcons; born in Exton
 Maria Sanford (1836–1920), Chester County school superintendent; professor at Swarthmore College and the University of Minnesota
 John Wallace Scott (1832–1903), Medal of Honor recipient during the Civil War
 Isaac Sharpless (1848–1920), president of Haverford College
 M. Night Shyamalan (born 1970), film director
 William Thomas Smedley (1858–1920), artist; member of the National Academy of Design
 James Smith (1719–1806), signer to the United States Declaration of Independence
 Kerr Smith (born 1972), actor
 William Preston Snyder (1851–1920), president pro tempore of the Pennsylvania Senate and Pennsylvania Auditor General
 Bayard Taylor (1825–1878), poet, novelist, and travel writer
 Miles Teller (born 1987), actor
 Martha Gibbons Thomas (1869–1942), first woman elected to the Pennsylvania House of Representatives from Chester County
 Richard Thomas (1744–1832), Pennsylvania state senator, U.S. Representative, and colonel during the American Revolutionary War 
 Richard Troxell, international opera star, aka "America's Tenor"
 Bernardhus Van Leer (1687–1790), German-American physician and centenarian
 Samuel Van Leer (1747–1825), captain during the American Revolution; owned Reading Furnace and other nearby historical places
 Anthony Wayne (1745–1796), Revolutionary War general known as "Mad Anthony" Wayne
 George Alexis Weymouth (1936–2016), artist (painter); "whip" stager; founder of the Brandywine Conservancy and the Brandywine River Museum
 Thomas Wharton Jr. (1735–1778), served as the first President of Pennsylvania (an office akin to Governor) following the Declaration of Independence
 William H. Whyte (1917–1999), urbanist and sociologist who coined the term "groupthink" and wrote The Organization Man bestselling book on management
 James P. Wickersham (1825–1891), principal of Millersville State Normal School, state school superintendent, and chargé d'affaires in Denmark
 Hugh Williamson (1735–1819), Founding Father, signatory of the U.S. Constitution, and US representative from North Carolina
 William (Amos) Wilson (1762–1821), folklore figure known as "The Pennsylvania Hermit"
 Andrew Wyeth (1917–2009), artist
 Jamie Wyeth (born 1946), artist
 N.C. Wyeth (1882–1945), artist and illustrator

See also
 Duffy's Cut
 National Register of Historic Places listings in Chester County, Pennsylvania

References

External links

Chester County Home Page
Chester County Government Meeting Minutes and local news at TownWatcher
Chester County Press Newspapers & Magazines
Collection of Chester County Quaker property records and other manuscripts from Friends Historical Library of Swarthmore College

1682 establishments in Pennsylvania
 
Populated places established in 1682